Omiloxetine (omiloextinum, omiloxetino INN) was a selective serotonin reuptake inhibitor drug candidate that underwent preclinical development by the Spanish pharmaceutical company, Ferrer Internacional, until 2005, when it was abandoned.

Rafael Foguet also patented Abaperidone.

References

4-Phenylpiperidines
Benzodioxoles
Ketones
Fluoroarenes
Phenethylamines
Selective serotonin reuptake inhibitors